Olya is a diminutive form of the first name Olga.

Olya may also refer to:

People
Olya Dubatova, Russian artist
Olya Ivanisevic, Serbian fashion model
Olya Kroytor, Russian artist
Olya Polyakova, Ukrainian entertainer
Olya Smeshlivaya, Russian snowboarder
Olya Viglione, Russian musician
Hasan Anami Olya, Iranian opera singer

Other uses
Olya, Russia, a  rural locality (a selo) in Astrakhan Oblast, Russia
Olya, Iran (disambiguation), several places in Iran
Olya, meaning "Upper", a common element in Iranian place names; see 
 "Olya", a song by the Ukrainian hard rock band Vopli Vidopliassova

See also
Olia (disambiguation)